Governor Calvert may refer to:

Benedict Calvert, 4th Baron Baltimore (1679–1715), 10th Proprietary-Governor of Maryland from 1684 to 1688
Benedict Leonard Calvert (1700–1732), 15th Proprietary Governor of Maryland from 1727 to 1731
Cecil Calvert, 2nd Baron Baltimore (1605–1675), Governor of Newfoundland (Avalon) from 1629 to 1632
Charles Calvert (governor) (1688–1734), 14th Proprietary-Governor of Maryland from 1720 to 1727
Charles Calvert, 3rd Baron Baltimore (1637–1715), 6th and 9th Proprietary-Governor of Maryland from 1661 to 1676 and from 1679 to 1684
Charles Calvert, 5th Baron Baltimore (1699–1751), 17th Proprietary Governor of the Province of Maryland from 1732 to 1733
George Calvert, 1st Baron Baltimore (1580–1632), Proprietary Governor of Newfoundland from 1627 to 1629
Leonard Calvert (1606–1647), 1st Proprietary-Governor of the Province of Maryland from 1634 to 1647
Phillip Calvert (governor) (1626–1682), Governor of Maryland in 1660 or 1661